Thomas Deruda (born July 13, 1986 in Marseille) is a French footballer who played as a midfielder in Ligue 1 for Olympique de Marseille and in Ligue 2 for FC Libourne-Saint-Seurin, Amiens SC, Montpellier HSC, AC Ajaccio and AC Arles-Avignon.

References

1986 births
Living people
French footballers
Olympique de Marseille players
FC Libourne players
Amiens SC players
CF Badalona players
Montpellier HSC players
AC Ajaccio players
AC Arlésien players
Ligue 1 players
Ligue 2 players
Association football midfielders